Dr. Martin C. Weisskopf (born April 21, 1942) is project scientist for NASA's Chandra X-ray Observatory and Chief Scientist for X-ray Astronomy in the Space Sciences Department at NASA's Marshall Space Flight Center in Huntsville, Alabama.

In 1964, he received his bachelor's degree (magna cum laude, with honors in Physics) from Oberlin College in Oberlin, Ohio. He then received a Woodrow Wilson Fellowship at Brandeis University in Waltham, Massachusetts where he earned his Ph.D. in Physics in 1969. He spent 1969 January through 1977 September at Columbia University, progressing from Research Associate to Assistant Professor. While at Columbia, he performed numerous pioneering experiments including the conception, design, construction, calibration, and flight of the sounding rocket experiment that first detected X-ray polarization from the Crab Nebula. While there he also pioneered in the development of high-resolution x-ray optics, including an arc-minute-resolution lightweight optic of the Kirkpatrick Baez design. In addition, he was a Co- Investigator and the Project Scientist (1975-1977) of the x-ray polarimeter experiment on the OSO-8 satellite, and an original Co-Investigator of what would become the EINSTEIN X-Ray Observatory. As such he became responsible for the time variability studies of the Monitor proportional Counter.  

In 1977 Dr. Weisskopf left Columbia to become Senior X- Ray Astronomer at MSFC and AXAF (now Chandra) Project Scientist. Subsequently, he became Chief of the X-Ray Astronomy Branch (1985-1993), a group he created. Before his retirement in May of 2022, he was Chief Scientist for X-Ray Astronomy at MSFC, a highly prestigious civil-service Senior Scientific and Technical position – one of only a few within the Agency. He retired from NASA in May 2022 and is now a NASA Emeritus.

Weisskopf has held numerous special appointments during his career. He is a senior co-investigator of the European Space Agency's international X-ray imaging experiment, called IBIS, and the originator of a major experimental research program that began in 1978 that currently concentrates on the development of X-ray optics.

He has served on numerous committees, including the National Academy of Science's Panel on High-Energy Astrophysics from Space, Astronomy, and Astrophysics Survey Committee. He is a member of the American Astronomical Society and its High-Energy Astrophysics Division; the American Association for the Advancement of Science; the International Astronomical Union; Sigma Xi, a scientific research society; Phi Beta Kappa, the National Honor Society, and a Fellow of the American Physical Society, Astrophysics Division.

Weisskopf is the recipient of numerous awards, including NASA Medals for Exceptional Service in 1992 and for Scientific Achievement in 1999. He was elected in 1994 as a Fellow of the American Physical Society, which cited his "pioneering work in X-ray polarimetry and time variability studies of cosmic X-ray sources, and his insightful leadership as Project Scientist for the Advanced X-ray Astrophysics Facility." In 2001, he was selected as a fellow in the International Society for Optical Engineering (SPIE) for his significant scientific and technical contributions to the optics community and SPIE. In 2004, together with Dr. H. Tananbaum, he received the Rossi Prize of the High Energy Astrophysics Division of the American Astronomical Society which cited "their vision, dedication, and leadership in the development, testing, and operation of the Chandra X-ray Observatory"

He is author or co-author of more than 360 publications which include refereed journal articles, articles in books, monographs, and papers in conference proceedings.

References

NASA people
1942 births
Space scientists
Living people
Brandeis University alumni
Oberlin College alumni
Fellows of the American Physical Society